Charles Milne (15 May 1864 – 6 May 1892) is a former Scotland international rugby union player.

Rugby Union career

Amateur career

Born in Kingston, Jamaica to Alexander Milne and Annie Hodgson, Charles Milne was then brought up in Fyvie, Aberdeenshire. His father Andrew was a Minister for Fyvie parish in Aberdeenshire.

Milne was educated at Fettes College. He then played rugby union for Fettesian-Lorettonians.

He then moved to play for West of Scotland.

He played for Edinburgh Wanderers.

Provincial career

He played for Glasgow District in the inter-city match against Edinburgh District on 5 December 1885.

He played for West of Scotland District against East of Scotland District on 30 January 1886.

He played for Edinburgh District in the inter-city match against Glasgow District on 4 December 1886.

He played for East of Scotland District against West of Scotland District on 29 January 1887.

International career

He was capped 3 times for Scotland in 1886.

Outside of rugby union

Milne was active in his local church, the East Church of Aberdeen, where he was elected an Elder. He took a career in teaching - and became a Master at the preparatory school of Fettes College. He took a bad bout of influenza and took time away from teaching; and depression settled over him. He went to the south coast of England for recuperation.

Death

Milne died in Chertsey, Surrey. His death was recorded as a railway accident as he got killed while crossing a railway line; whether this was related to his depression or just an unfortunate accident is unclear. The minister at his eulogy stated that his letters were once again becoming cheerful and he hoped to be back at teaching in about a month.

At his death Milne held the post of H.M. Inspector of Schools in Aberdeen. The value of his estate was £1082; 15 shillings; and 6 pence.

References

1864 births
1892 deaths
Scottish rugby union players
Scotland international rugby union players
West of Scotland FC players
Fettesian-Lorretonian rugby union players
East of Scotland District players
Edinburgh Wanderers RFC players
West of Scotland District (rugby union) players
Glasgow District (rugby union) players
Edinburgh District (rugby union) players
Sportspeople from Kingston, Jamaica
Rugby union forwards